Chevella mandal is one of the 27 mandals in Rangareddy district of the Indian state of Telangana. It is under the administration of Chevella revenue division and the headquarters are located at Chevella town.the near by villages are urella, aloor etc. The mandal is bounded by Shabad, Moinabad, Shankarpally and Pudur mandals.

Villages

1 Allawada
2 Aloor I
3 Aloor II
4 Aloor III
5 Antawaram
6 Bastepur
7 Chanvelly
8 Chevella village
9 Damargidda
10 Dearlapally
11 Devarampall
12 Devuni Erravally
13 Gollapally
14 Gundala
15 Hasthepur
16 Ibrahimpall
17 Kammeta
18 Kandawada
19 Kesaram
20 Khanapur
21 Kistapur
22 Kowkuntla
23 Kummera
24 Malkapur
25 Mirjaguda
26 Mudimyal
27 Naincheru
28 Nowlaipalle
29 Nyalata
30 Orella
31 Pamena
32 Ravulapally (Khurd)
33 Regadghanapur
34 Tallaram
35 Tangedapally
36 Yenkepalle
37 Narayandasguda(Bundhelgudem)

References

Mandals in Ranga Reddy district